Mindy Jones is an American singer-songwriter from Los Angeles, California and is currently the lead singer for recording artist Moby. Her collaborations with him include co-writing the track "The Waste of Suns" on the album Everything Was Beautiful, and Nothing Hurt, a cover of "The Big Dream" by American director David Lynch for the album Innocents, a live version of "Go" at a benefit concert for the David Lynch foundation, and his last two albums, played during his most recent tour at the Fonda and Ace theatres in downtown Los Angeles.

She is currently working on a new project called ADLT VDEO with Luke Top of Fool's Gold.

In addition to Blindspot, her songs have also been featured in Pretty Little Liars, Hot Girls Wanted, Hemlock Grove, Timeless, Stitchers, the Super Bowl commercial for Independence Day: Resurgence, Scream and many more.

In 2021, she covered Bjarke Niemann's "Champions of the Wild Side" for the launch trailer of Hitman 3.
The same year, she sang the cover of David Bowie's Heroes on Moby's album Reprise, released by Deutsche Grammophon.

References

External links
 

American women singer-songwriters
Singers from Los Angeles
1980 births
Living people
21st-century American singers
21st-century American women singers
Singer-songwriters from California